Słubice  (1943–1945, German Schlaubitz) is a village in Płock County, Masovian Voivodeship, in central Poland. It is the seat of the gmina (administrative district) called Gmina Słubice.

The village has a population of 2,200.

Sights
The historic landmarks of the village are the palace, formerly owned by the Mikorski, Potocki, Skrażyński and Grzybowski noble families, and the Saint Martin church.

Sports
The local football club is Mazowia Słubice. It competes in the lower leagues.

References

Villages in Płock County